Denise Black (born 16 March 1958) is an English actress. She is best known for her roles in Coronation Street and Emmerdale and guest starring as Jessie Devlin Denny Blood's mother in ITV drama series Bad Girls.

Early life and career
Black was born in Emsworth, Hampshire. After attending Portsmouth High School for Girls, she studied psychology at London University. She had taken a number of jobs, including working in a local psychiatric care home. After graduating, she travelled to Gibraltar and later the West Indies, where she decided she wanted to become an actress. Her first professional role was as a cat in Miniatures at Sheffield's Crucible Theatre. She worked in several fringe theatres before gaining her Equity card in 1980. Black joined the Actors' Touring Company and performed Shakespeare around South America and in Israel, Greece and Yugoslavia.

When Black returned to the UK, she appeared with fellow-actresses Josie Lawrence and Kate McKenzie at the Newcastle Playhouse in La Pasionaria, and to further their interests in music and singing, they formed a jazz group, Denise Black & the Kray Sisters. Her friendship with Lawrence landed Black parts in Channel 4's Saturday Live and Josie. Black then joined Julian Clary on stage at London's Donmar Warehouse.

In 1988 she appeared at the Oldham Coliseum in The Threepenny Opera. Over the years, Black would feature in numerous other stage productions including Art of Success; Stop Children's Laughter (at Bolton's Octagon Theatre), and Shakespeare's King Lear and Twelfth Night (with the Cambridge Touring Company).

In 1990, Black made her television drama debut in "Street Life", an episode of the BBC's Casualty, playing a prostitute. She also appeared as Carrie Evans in Shoscombe Old Place, an edition of The Casebook of Sherlock Holmes, broadcast in 1991. She appeared in many television series during the 1990s and 2000s including A Touch of Frost, Dangerfield, The Bill, Bad Girls, New Tricks and Doc Martin amongst others.

Coronation Street
In 1992, Black joined the soap opera Coronation Street as Denise Osbourne, remaining on the show until 1997. Her main storylines revolved around her love affair with Ken Barlow (William Roache). Black briefly returned to the role in 2007 and again in 2017.

Queer as Folk
Black was one of the main cast members of the Channel 4 TV series Queer As Folk, written by Russell T Davies. She played the role of Hazel Tyler in all 10 episodes of the show. She reprised the role of Hazel (as her ghost on Canal Street) in the 2015 follow-up series Cucumber.

Emmerdale
On 20 June 2013, it was announced that Black would be joining the cast of Emmerdale as Joanie Wright, the adoptive grandmother of Amy Wyatt's (Chelsea Halfpenny) son Kyle whom she gave away shortly after he was born. Black made her first appearance in the soap on 12 August 2013, before departing on 14 November 2013. She reprised the role on 17 June 2015 as a regular cast member, before Black departed again permanently on 30 January 2017, when her character was killed off from a heart attack after being released from a short-stint in prison.

Other roles
Black performed for a period with the touring show Grumpy Old Women Live.

In 2004, she won a MEN Award for her portrayal of Mari Hoff in the Royal Exchange, Manchester production of The Rise and Fall of Little Voice.

In August 2010, Black's band played at the Edinburgh Festival when she was in mid-UK national tour of a stage version of Calendar Girls.

On 26 September 2011, Black played the role of Mother Superior, in the first UK tour of the musical Sister Act, alongside Michael Starke as Monsignor Howard and Cynthia Erivo as Deloris.

On 23 January 2015, Black made a guest appearance in Benidorm as Liam Conroy's (Adam Gillen) mother Gloria, attempting to lure him back to the UK.

In June 2020, it was announced that Black would star in the upcoming epic historical drama film The Lady of Heaven'' in the role of Bibi, a loving grandmother who narrates the historical story of Lady Fatima.

Personal life
Black lives in Southsea and sings with a band, The Loose Screw. They played a series of cabaret shows in November 2009.

References

External links

Denise and The Loose Screw on MySpace Music
From Kray Sisters to Loose Screw – An Interview with Denise Black

Living people
1958 births
Alumni of the University of London
English soap opera actresses
English stage actresses
English television actresses
People educated at Portsmouth High School (Southsea)
People from Emsworth